Maksim Vadimovich Kiselyov (born 30 January 1995) is a Russian football player. He plays for FC Novosibirsk.

Club career
He made his debut in the Russian Professional Football League for FC Sibir-2 Novosibirsk on 22 September 2015 in a game against FC Yakutiya Yakutsk.

He made his Russian Football National League debut for FC Sibir Novosibirsk on 3 March 2019 in a game against FC Tyumen.

References

External links
 Profile by Russian Professional Football League

1995 births
Sportspeople from Saratov
Living people
Russian footballers
Association football goalkeepers
FC Sibir Novosibirsk players
FC Sokol Saratov players
FC Tekstilshchik Ivanovo players
FC Chayka Peschanokopskoye players